Tatton Sykes or Sir Tatton Sykes may refer to:

People 
 Sir Tatton Sykes, 4th Baronet, (1772–1863), English landowner and stock breeder
 Sir Tatton Sykes, 5th Baronet, (1826–1913), English landowner, racehorse breeder and eccentric

Other uses 
 Sir Tatton Sykes (horse), a racehorse